Nationality words link to articles with information on the nation's poetry or literature (for instance, Irish or France).

Events

Works published

France
 Nicolas Boileau-Despréaux, France, L'Œuvres diverses du sieur D...., including:
 L'Art poétique, in imitation of the Ars Poetica of Horace, and very influential in French and English literature; Alexander Pope's Essay on Criticism imitated Boileau's maxims; in four books: the first and last containing general precepts; the second, on the pastoral, elegy, ode, epigram and satire; the third, on epic and tragic poetry
 Le Lutrin, a mock-heroic poem in four cantos, with two later added by the author
 Translator, On the Sublime, from the Latin of Longinus; a second edition in 1693 also included certain critical reflections
 Second Epistle
 Third Epistle
 Rene Rapin, Reflexions sur la Poetique d' Aristote, criticism, France; translated into English this year by Thomas Rymer

Great Britain
 Samuel Butler, Hudibras. The First and Second Parts, published anonymously (see Hudibras, the First Part 1663, Hudibras. The Second Part 1664, Hudibras. The Third and Last Part 1678; Hudibras. In Three Parts 1684)
 Thomas Flatman, Poems and Songs
 John Milton, Paradise Lost: A poem in twelve books, the second edition, revised and expanded to 12 books, published in July; commendatory poems by "S.B." in Latin and Andrew Marvell in English (see also Paradise Lost 1667)
 Thomas Rymer, translation, Reflections on Aristotles Treatise of Posie, published anonymously, criticism translated from Rene Rapin's Reflexions sur la Poetique d' Aristote, also published this year

Other
 Thomas Hansen Kingo, Aandelige Siunge-Koor ("Spiritual Song Choir"), first part (second part 1681), Denmark

Births
Death years link to the corresponding "[year] in poetry" article:
 June 20 – Nicholas Rowe (died 1718), English Poet Laureate, dramatist and miscellaneous writer
 July 17 – Isaac Watts (died 1748), English hymnist, called the "Father of English Hymnody"
 September 11 – Elizabeth Singer Rowe (died 1737) English poet, novelist, devotional writer and playwright
 October 9 (bapt.) – Ambrose Philips (died 1749), English poet and politician
 Also – Mary Davys (died 1732), (probably) Irish-born poet and playwright

Deaths
Birth years link to the corresponding "[year] in poetry" article:
 February 22 – Jean Chapelain (born 1595), French poet and writer
 June 14 – Marin le Roy de Gomberville (born 1600), French poet and novelist
 October 10 – Thomas Traherne (born 1636), English poet and religious writer
 October 15 – Robert Herrick – (born 1591), English poet
 October 27 – Hallgrímur Pétursson (born 1614), one of Iceland's most famous poets and a clergyman
 November 8 – John Milton (born 1608), English poet
Also:
 Mehmed IV Giray (born 1610), poet and khan of the Crimean Khanate
 Neşâtî (born unknown), Ottoman Sufi mystical poet

See also

Poetry
 17th century in poetry
 17th century in literature
 Restoration literature

References

17th-century poetry
Poetry